Obejo is a city located in the province of Córdoba, Spain.

References

External links
Obejo - Sistema de Información Multiterritorial de Andalucía

Municipalities in the Province of Córdoba (Spain)